The 2002 Budapest Assembly election was held on 20 October 2002, concurring with other local elections in Hungary.

Mayor 

Incumbent Gábor Demszky was directly elected mayor in a three-way race against Fidesz–KDNP supported independent candidate Pál Schmitt and MSZP candidate Erzsébet Gy. Németh with 46.70% of the vote.

Results 

List seats were distributed using the D'Hondt method.

Notes

References 

2002 in Hungary
Budapest
Local elections in Hungary
History of Budapest
October 2002 events in Europe